Hong Soo-hwan (Hangul: 홍수환, born May 26, 1950) is a South Korean former professional boxer who competed between 1969 and 1980. He is a world champion in two weight classes, having held the WBA and The Ring bantamweight titles from 1974 to 1975 and the WBA super-bantamweight title from 1977 to 1978.

Professional career
Hong turned pro in 1969 and in 1974 captured the WBA and The Ring bantamweight title with a decision win over Arnold Taylor in a fight in which Taylor was down in the 1st, 5th, and 14th rounds. He lost his title in his 2nd defense to Alfonso Zamora in 1975. In 1977 he captured the vacant WBA super bantamweight title in a 3rd-round knockout of Hector Carrasquilla. Hong was down 4 times in the 2nd and came back in the following round to win. He lost the title in his 2nd defense to Ricardo Cardona in 1978.

Professional boxing record

Honors
Hong was named The Rings Progress of the Year fighter for 1974.

See also
List of bantamweight boxing champions
List of super-bantamweight boxing champions

References

External links
 
 Official Website
Hong Soo-hwan - CBZ Profile

1950 births
Living people
Bantamweight boxers
Super-bantamweight boxers
World bantamweight boxing champions
World super-bantamweight boxing champions
World Boxing Association champions
The Ring (magazine) champions
South Korean male boxers
Sportspeople from Seoul
Namyang Hong clan